Igor Anatolyevich Kurakin (9 April 1963 – 8 August 2000 in a road accident) was a Russian professional footballer.

Club career
He played 4 seasons in the Soviet Top League for PFC CSKA Moscow and FC Torpedo Moscow.

References

External links
 

1963 births
Footballers from Moscow
Road incident deaths in Russia
2000 deaths
Soviet footballers
Russian footballers
Association football midfielders
PFC CSKA Moscow players
FC Torpedo Moscow players
FC Sokol Saratov players
Soviet Top League players
Russian expatriate footballers
Expatriate footballers in Finland